"Clancy of the Overflow" is a poem by Banjo Paterson, first published in The Bulletin, an Australian news magazine, on 21 December 1889. The poem is typical of Paterson, offering a romantic view of rural life, and is one of his best-known works.

The poem is written in eight stanzas of four lines, lines one and three in a two-feet anapaest with a feminine internal rhyme, and lines two and four in trochaic octameter with masculine rhymes: AA–B–CC–B.

History
The poem is written from the point of view of a city-dweller who once met the title character, a shearer and drover, and now envies the imagined pleasures of Clancy's lifestyle, which he compares favourably to life in "the dusty, dirty city" and "the round eternal of the cashbook and the journal".

And the bush hath friends to meet him, and their kindly voices greet him
In the murmur of the breezes and the river on its bars,
And he sees the vision splendid of the sunlit plains extended,
And at night the wond'rous glory of the everlasting stars.

The poem is possibly based on Paterson's own experience. The introduction to Banjo Paterson's Images of Australia by Douglas Baglin quotes Paterson as saying that he was working as a lawyer when someone asked him to send a letter to a man named Thomas Gerald Clancy, asking for a payment that had not been received. Paterson sent the letter to "The Overflow", a sheep station 100 kilometres south-west of Nyngan, and received a reply that read:

Clancy's gone to Queensland droving, and we don't know where he are.

The letter looked as though it had been written with a thumbnail dipped in tar and it is from this that Banjo Paterson found the inspiration for the poem, along with the meter.

The poem was well-received and raised much curiosity about the identity of "The Banjo". Soon after its publication, Rolf Boldrewood, author of Robbery Under Arms (1882), wrote in his literary column for The Australasian that "Clancy of the Overflow" was "the best bush ballad since Gordon".

Clancy makes a cameo appearance in another popular Banjo Paterson poem, "The Man from Snowy River", which was first published the following year.

There are claims that Clancy was based on a man called Thomas Michael MacNamara, who described the ride with the "Man from Snowy River" (his brother in law Jim Troy) in an article in The Courier-Mail in 1938 

In 1897, Thomas Gerald Clancy wrote a poem in reply to "Clancy of the Overflow", entitled "Clancy's Reply", which paints a far less romantic picture of the life of a drover. There had also been a parody in 1892, "The Overflow of Clancy".

In other media
Clancy was portrayed by Jack Thompson in the movie The Man from Snowy River, and Clancy is mentioned in the musical theatre production The Man from Snowy River: Arena Spectacular – during the recitation of the poem, Clancy is mentioned by Steve Bisley in his role of Banjo Paterson while the poem is being re-enacted in the show.

Contemporary recordings of the poem include Jack Thompson's recitation on Jack Thompson, The Bush Poems of A.B. (Banjo) Paterson (2008) and Jack Thompson, Favourite Australian Poems, Fine Poets Collection, volume 5 (2010).

The poem "Clancy of the Overflow" has also been set to music and recorded several times, including:
 John Cameron's recording of Albert Arlen's setting, with an orchestra conducted by George S. English (1955);
 Peter Dawson's recording of the same setting, with the London Symphony Orchestra conducted by Charles Mackerras (4 May 1955);
 In 1974 Slim Dusty released a song version on LP.
 In 1980 the Australian folk group Wallis and Matilda recorded a popular song version of the poem, eventually peaking at 30 on the ARIA charts;
 John Schumann of Redgum recorded it on his 1993 album True Believers;
 Tenor Australis included a musical arrangement of the poem on their 1999 album Under an Australian Sky;
 Comedian Adam Hills performed it on his ABC show Adam Hills Tonight in July 2013 as a mashup with Ali McGregor singing The Church hit "Under the Milky Way".
 Melbourne-based production company Yut Art produced a contemporary version in 2013.

Proposed film
In 2004, there were plans to make a movie of "Clancy of the Overflow", a sequel to the 1982 film The Man from Snowy River, but this fell through due to financial reasons. The director was to have been Simon Wincer, who was a co-producer for The Man from Snowy River. Bruce Rowland (who composed the music for both the 1982 film The Man from Snowy River and its 1988 sequel film The Man from Snowy River II, as well as composing music for The Man from Snowy River: Arena Spectacular, was to compose the music for the film. The film was to have been funded by private investors, but the A$22 million minimum investment was not met by the deadline of June 2004, and the film has been shelved indefinitely.

See also
 Bulletin Debate

References

External links 

 "Clancy of the Overflow", text, middlemiss.org
 "Clancy of the Overflow film in the works", The Sydney Morning Herald (1 June 2004)
 "clancy@theoverflow", a 21st-century Clancy

1889 poems
Poetry by Banjo Paterson
Australian folklore
Australian country music songs
Works originally published in The Bulletin (Australian periodical)